Apple Inc. has developed four Unix-like operating systems, namely iOS, iPadOS, tvOS, and watchOS. Devices using these systems include the iPhone, iPod Touch, and iPad, which are mobile devices; the Apple TV, which is a digital media player; and the Apple Watch, which is a smartwatch. About 1.35 billion iOS devices had been sold worldwide by March 2015, and about 2.2 billion had been sold by March 2022.

Models

Legend

iPhone

Supported

Unsupported (64-bit CPU)

Unsupported (32-bit CPU)

iPod Touch

Apple TV 
The second and third generation of Apple TV run an unnamed operating system derived from iOS. The fourth and subsequent generations of Apple TV run the iOS-based tvOS. (The first generation ran a modified version of Mac OS X Tiger instead of iOS.)

Supported

Unsupported (32-bit CPU)

Apple Watch

In production and supported

Discontinued but still supported

Discontinued and unsupported

Comparison of iPhone models

Timeline

Status

Geekbench scores 
Note: Hardware reviewers have commented that these benchmark results are not comparable with other CPU/SoC's architecture due to the software codes optimization.

See also 
 iOS version history
 List of iPad models
 iPhone (disambiguation)
 List of iPod models

References

External links 
 Official Apple sites
 
 
 
 

 Apple support technical specifications
 iPhone
 iPod Touch
 Apple TV

Apple Inc. lists
IOS
IPhone
IPod
Lists of mobile phones
iOS